The Journal of Gerontological Nursing is a monthly peer-reviewed nursing journal covering gerontological nursing. It was established in 1975 and is published by Slack.

History
The journal was established as a bimonthly journal in 1975 with Edna M. Stilwell as founding editor-in-chief. She served until 1997, when she was succeeded by Kathleen C. Buckwalter. Buckwalter continued until 2011, when she was replaced by the current editor, Donna M. Fick (Pennsylvania State University).

In 1980, the journal increased its publication frequency from six issues per year to 12.

Abstracting and indexing
The journal is abstracted and indexed in:

According to the Journal Citation Reports, the journal has a 2017 impact factor of 0.752.

See also

List of nursing journals

References

External links

Monthly journals
English-language journals
Gerontological nursing journals
Publications established in 1975
Gerontology journals